The 2018 Inter-Provincial Championship was the sixth edition of the Inter-Provincial Championship, a first-class cricket competition played in Ireland. It was held from 1 May to 6 September 2018. It was the second edition of the competition to be played with first-class status. Leinster Lightning were the defending champions. The venue for the opening fixture, originally scheduled to take place at Oak Hill Cricket Club Ground, was moved to Pembroke Cricket Club, due to poor weather.

Seventeen of Ireland's international players took part in the opening fixture of the tournament, ahead of Ireland's first Test match, which was played against Pakistan on 11 May 2018.

North West Warriors won the tournament, following the conclusion of the fifth match of the competition. They beat Northern Knights by 140 runs to give them an unassailable lead. It was the first time that a side other than Leinster Lightning had won the tournament.

Points table

 Champions

Fixtures

1st match

2nd match

3rd match

4th match

5th match

6th match

References

External links
 Series home at ESPN Cricinfo

Inter
Inter-Provincial Championship seasons